Persatuan Sepak Bola Indonesia Bantul, commonly known as Persiba Bantul, is a semi-professional Indonesian football club based in Bantul, Yogyakarta. They currently compete in the Liga 3.

History 
Persiba Bantul was established on 21 September 1967. 2004 marked a milestone in Persiba's history, after waiting for 37 years, they were promoted to the First Division. Drs. H.M. Idham Samawi plays a major role in this success, by helping them gaining financial support from the local government.

In 2005, PSSI loaned Persiba to use the Indonesia U-20 players in the First Division. In 2006, Persiba was forced to quit the 2006 First Division because of the 2006 Yogyakarta earthquake. They returned in 2007 and after almost got promoted in 2008–09 and 2009–10, they won the 2010–11 Liga Indonesia Premier Division by defeating Persiraja 1–0 and promoted to the Indonesia Super League. They also participated in the Indonesian Premier League.

They were relegated back to the Liga Indonesia Premier Division after finishing last place in the 2014 Indonesia Super League East group.

Key 

Key to league record:
 Pos = Final position
 P = Played
 W = Games won
 D = Games drawn
 L = Games lost
 GF = Goals for
 GA = Goals against
 GD = Goal difference
 Pts = Points

Key to rounds:
 W = Winner
 F = Final
 SF = Semi-finals
 QF = Quarter-finals
 R16 = Round of 16
 R32 = Round of 32
 R64 = Round of 64
 R5 = Fifth round
 R4 = Fourth round
 R3 = Third round
 R2 = Second round
 R1 = First round
 GS = Group stage

Key to competitions
 Cup = Piala Indonesia
 CL = AFC Champions League
 AC = AFC Cup

Seasons

Stadium 
Persiba Bantul plays its home games at the Sultan Agung Stadium.

Supporters 
Persiba's supporter group is called Paserbumi (Pasukan Suporter Bantul Militan).

Honours

League 
 Liga Indonesia Premier Division
 Champion: 2010–11

Cups 
 Bupati Cilacap Cup
 Champion: 2010
 Piala Gubernur Aceh
 Runner-up: 2011
 Batik Cup
 Champion: 2012
 Magelang Cup
 Champion: 2012

See also 
 List of football clubs in Indonesia

References

External links 
 Fans site 
 Persiba Bantul at Liga Indonesia

 
Football clubs in the Special Region of Yogyakarta
Association football clubs established in 1967
1967 establishments in Indonesia
Indonesian Premier Division winners